Sindhudurg district (Marathi pronunciation: [sin̪d̪ʱud̪uɾɡ]) is an administrative district of the Konkan division in India, which was carved out of the erstwhile Ratnagiri district. The district headquarters are located at Oros and the district occupies an area of approximately 5,207 km and has a population of 849,651, of which 12.59% were urban (as of 2011). As of 2011, it's the least populous district of Maharashtra (out of 36).

Officer

Members of Parliament
Vinayak Raut SHS(UBT)

Guardian Minister

list of Guardian Minister

District Magistrate/Collector

list of District Magistrate / Collector

History

The word 'Konkan' is of Indian origin and considerable antiquity, though the origin of the name has never been definitively explained. The seven kingdoms of the Konkan of mythology are mentioned in the History of Kashmir and are said to have included nearly the whole west coast of India. The Pandavas are said to have passed through this region in the 13th year of their exile and to have settled in this area for some time. The Raja of this region, Veerat Ray, accompanied them in the war at Kurukshetra with the Kauravas.

In the second century A.D., the Maurya Empire annexed the Konkan coast. In the middle of the sixth century, kings of the Maurya and Nala dynasties appear to have ruled in the Konkan. The district of Ratnagiri was under the Silahars, and the capital of their kingdom was probably Goa. Later it may have been relocated to a more central place in the vicinity of Ratnagiri or Kharepatan. Chandrapur was one of the most ancient towns in Konkan, probably founded by Chandraditya, son of the Chalukya king Pulakeshin II.

The 16th century saw the advent and rise of Portuguese power on the west coast of India and Sindhudurg was not immune. The sultan lost his hold on the district in 1675 with the rise of Chhatrapati Shivaji Maharaj, and the district became part of the Maratha Empire. Marathas continued to rule the district till 1817, when the conflict between the British and the Peshwas concluded and the whole of Konkan was transferred to the British.

In 1819 South Konkan was formed as separate district with its headquarters first at Bankot and later at Ratnagiri. Three northern subdivisions were transferred to Thane district in 1830 and the district was reduced to a sub-collectorate level under Thane district. In 1832, it was again made a full-fledged district and named Ratnagiri district. In the year 1945, a new Mahal (tahsil) called Kankavli Mahal (tahsil) was formed. The former Indian state of Sawantwadi was merged with the district and the taluka boundaries reorganized in the year 1949. In the same year the new taluka of Sawantwadi was created and two new mahals, Kudal and Lanja, were formed. With the reorganization of states in 1956, the district was included in Bombay State and since 1960, it is a part of Maharashtra. The name of the district has been adopted from the sea fort of Sindhudurg. This was built by Shivaji Maharaj near Malwan and its name literally means ‘Sea Fort’. Its construction started on 25 November 1664 and was completed in three years, designed such that it could not be seen easily by enemies coming from the Arabian Sea.

Sindhudurg district is the southern part of the Konkan coast which is historically known for its long coast line and safe harbours. Sindhudurg district was earlier a part of Ratnagiri district. For administrative convenience and industrial and agricultural development, Ratnagiri district was divided into Ratnagiri and Sindhudurg with effect from 1 May 1981. Sindhudurg district now comprises the eight tahsils of Sawantwadi, Kudal, Vengurla, Malvan, Devgad, Kankavli, Vaibhavwadi and Dodamarg.

Geography
Sindhudurg district is the southern most district of Maharashtra. It has deposits of Iron, Bauxite and Manganese. Sindhudurg is bordered on the north by Ratnagiri district, on the south by the state of Goa, on the west by the Arabian Sea, and to the east across the crest of the Western Ghats or Sahyadris is Kolhapur district. Sindhudurg is part of the Konkan (coastal) region, a narrow coastal plain in western Maharashtra which lies between the Western Ghats and the Arabian Sea.

Sindhudurg has a semi-tropical climate and remains warm and humid most of the year. It has three clear seasons: rainy (June–October), Winter (November–mid February) and Summer (mid February–May). Temperatures rise to a maximum of 32 °C and monsoon winds bring heavy rains (average rainfall 3240.10 mm).

The people of Sindhudurg district mostly speak Konkani and a distinct dialect of Konkani called "Malvani"; almost all are fluent in Marathi as well.

About the district 
Sindhudurg district was established on 1 May 1981.

Tehsils and Panchayat Samiti:
 Dodamarg
 Sawantwadi
 Kudal
 Vengurla
 Malvan
 Kankavli
 Devgad
 Vaibhavwadi

Nagar Palika:
Dodamarg
 kudal
 Sawantwadi
 Malvan
Devgad-Jamsande
 Kankavli
 Vengurla

Cities:
 Sawantwadi
 Vaibhavwadi
 Malvan
 Kankavli
 Vengurla
 Kudal
 Oros
 Devgad
 Dodamarg

Smaller towns include :
 Dodamarg
 Vaibhavwadi
 Vijaydurg
 Banda
 Amboli
 Rameshwar
 Girye
 Mangaon
 Shiroda
 Mhapan
 Phondaghat
 Bhedshi
 Kot Kamte
 Kandalgaon
 Katta
 Talere
 Shirgaon
 Naringre
 Kharepatan
 Achara
 Sukalwad 
 Khotale
 Hedul
 Vanygawde
 Kasal
 Pawashi
 Kadawal
 Trimbak
 Masure
 Bandiwade,(बांदिवडे) Malvan
 Jamsande
 Shiroda
 Ghonsari
 Hivale
 Poip
 Tirlot
 Navanagar
 Amberi
 Waghotan
 Tirawade
 Redi
 Talvade Gate
 Tale Bazar
 Salgaon
 Bhuibawada- Vaibhavwadi
 Kunkeshwar
 Katwan
 Phanasgaon
 Undil
 Manache-mutat
 Mathbudruk
 Budhavle
 Sanadave
 Masure
 Shivapur Kudal
 Ovaliye

Villages:
 Gothos

Gram Panchayats:  433
Villages:    743
Towns:   5
Police Stations:  9
Police Outposts:  23

Agriculture
Sindhudurg's major crops are Rice, Coconut, Kokum, Mango and Cashew, of which the last three are the major annual crops.

The irrigated area in Sindhudurg is 23.48%, through wells and small canals. 33,910 hectares of the district's agricultural land are irrigated, while  hectares are not. 74% of the total land holding in the district is held by small and marginal farmers. The district has 38,643 hectares of forest cover.

Irrigation 

Major projects: 2 (Tilari and Talamba)
Medium projects: 4
Small projects (state owned): 33
Small projects (Zilla Parishad owned): 460

Education
Primary schools: Zilla Parishad operated – 1469, Private – 49
Secondary schools: Grantable institutions - 184, Central Government institutions: 1, Private: 22
Junior Colleges: 43
Senior Colleges: 7
D.Ed./ B.Ed. Colleges: 4 + 1
Medical Colleges: 2 (Government Medical College (GMC) started in 2022, it is in town Oros)
Engineering Colleges: 2
Polytechnic Colleges: 3
Industrial Training Institutes (ITI): 7  (1. Sawantwadi  2. Malvan  3. Deogad  4. Sindhudurgnagari  5. Vengurla  6. Phondaghat  7. Vaibhavwadi)

Economy
Banking sector: The district has
Nationalised banks (66 branches), Co-operative banks (106 branches) and rural banks (15 branches).
 Fisheries
Sindhudurg has a sea coast length of 121 km. and an Exclusive economic zone spanning 16000 km2.
Main fisheries centers of Sindhudurg are 8 - Vijaydurg, Devgad, Nivati, Achara, Malvan, Sarjekot, Vengurla, Shiroda
Total fish production: 19273 M. Tons
Fisheries Co.Op. Soc.: 34 (total members: 14216)

Cuisine
The cuisine of the district is popularly known as Malvani cuisine. Coconut, rice, and fish feature prominently in Malvani cuisine. Seafood, particularly Bangada, Paplet, prawns, and Tisrya, is very popular. Kombdi Vade, also called Vade Sagoti, a chicken savory, is the most popular dish. Others include Ukadya Tandulachi Pej (उकड्या तांदळाची पेज – a semi-fluid boiled brown-red rice Congee preparation) and Solkadhi (सोल कढी – A preparation made of sol (kokum) सोल and coconut milk). Dry fish is also a local delicacy - varieties include Sungata and Golma which are both dried prawn preparations.

Malvani cuisine differs from cuisines in the rest of Maharashtra, with dishes prepared using locally available spices and generally with little oil. Some popular Malvani dishes include
 Kombadi Vade or Vade Sagoti (कोंबडी वडे thick puris made of rice flour)
 Ghavane – ras (घावने - Rice dosa with sweet coconut milk)
 Amboli –  (आंबोळी उसळ - fermented rice dosa with spicy curry)
 Shirvale (शिरवाळे - noodles served with sweet coconut milk)
 Dhondas (धोंडस)
 Fried fish and fish curry using Malvani spices
 Solkadi (सोलकढी)
 Khaprolya (खापरोळ्या)
 Malvani Ukadiche Modak (Steamed Modak)
 Malvani Khaja (खा)
 Nhevre/Karanjee (करंजी - Stuffed crunchy sweet delicacy)
 Olya Kajuchi 
 Pithi Bhat (पिठी-भात - Pithi is made of horsegram unlike the besan prevalent across the rest of Maharashtra)
 Ukdya Tandlachi Pej with
 Phanasachi bhaji (Jackfruit dish)

Mango is a major influence on the socioeconomic life of Sindhudurg. Alphonso Mango (हापुस आंबा ) varieties from Devgad are particularly popular. Other varieties of mango: Mankur (मानकुर), Goa Mankur, Keshar, Pāyari (पायरी), Karel (करेल – used for preparing Mango Pickle), and Rayval are also popular for their distinct taste. Jackfruit is also one of the most popular fruits of Sindhudurg.

Malvani cuisine also has many vegetarian dishes, including Garyache Sandan, Karmal pickle, Bimble, Amba Halad, Karadichi Bhakri, Kanyacha Sanja, Appe, Ghavan, Dalimichi Usual, and Kaju Usual, Raiwal Ambyacha Rayta, Yelapp.

Places of attraction

Tourist destinations 
 Amboli Hill Station Sawantwadi  
 Sindhudurg Fort in Malvan
 Vijaydurg Fort Devgad
 Tarkarli Beach
 Nivati Rock (a lighthouse in deep sea), Nivati Beach
 Bhagvati Temple, Dhamapur Lake
 Vengurla bandar (fishing port)
 Ganapati Temple, Redi
 Vetoba temple (Vengurla)
 Ubhadanda beach (Vengurla)
 Sawantwadi Palace
 Sawantwadi Lake (Moti Talav)
 Rock garden at Malvan
 Hanumantagad, Fukeri (Dodamarg)
 Tilari Dam (Dodamarg)
 Mangeli Waterfall (Dodamarg) 
 Navdurga Redi
 Napapne Waterfall, Vaibhavwadi
 Achara Beach and Rameshwar Temple (16th century)
 Mangeli waterfall (Dodamarg taluka – near Goa)
 Shi Mandir, Medhe (Dodamarg taluka )
 Dream Land Garden, Navivadi (Kudal taluka)
 Rameshwar Temple Kandalgaon
 Manache waterfall 
 Bharatgad Fort, Masure (Malvan)
 Manohar Manosantosh Gad (Shivapur) (Kudal taluka)
 Shivapur Waterfall Gadakarwadi, Ghawhalwadi (Kudaldeshkar taluka)

Temples 
 Shri Devi Mauli Mandir (Tiravade)
 Shri Devi Sateri temple (Pawashi)
 Shri Devi Lingeshwar temple (Tulsuli tarf Mangaon)
 Shri Devi Gothanadevi temple (Tulsuli tarf Mangaon)
 Kunkeshwar temple, Devgad
 Lakshminarayan temple, Walwal
 Shri Sateri Bhadrakali temple, Aronda
 Shri Bramhanand Swami Math, Ozar (Taluka Malvan)
 Bharadi Devi temple, Aangnewadi, Masure
 Shri Sai Baba temple (First and oldest temple of Saibaba in India), Kudal
 Redi Ganesh Vengurla
 Navadurga temple at Redi
 Shri Dev Rameshwar temple (17th Century) in Aakeri, Sawantwadi
 Shri Dev Rameshwar Temple (16th Century) in Rameshwar, Girye-Vijaydurg
 Shree Dev Rameshwar temple, Achara
 Bhalchandra Maharaj Ashram, Kankavli
 Shri Rahateshwar Mandir, Devgad
 Shri Dev Gangeshvar, Lore No. 1 (Kankavli)
 Shri Dev Kaleshwar temple, Nerur (Kudal)
 Shri Dev Kudaleshwar temple, Kudal
 Shri Dev Laxmi Narayan, Walawal (Kudal)
 Shri Dev Ravalnath temple (Ambdos, Malvan)
 Shri Devi Mauli temple, Walawal (Kudal)
 Shri Devi Yakshini temple, Mangaon (Kudal)
 Shri Dev Ling Ravalnath Karanje Mandir, Karanje (Kanakavli)
 Shri Dev Gopalkrishna temple, Talashil-Tondavali (Malvan)
 Shri Dev Rameshwar temple, Humarmala-Walawal (Kudal)
 Shri Devi Sateri Shantadurga temple, Mhapan (Vengurle)
 Shri Dev Siddheshwar temple, Mhapan (Vengurle)
 Shri Dev Adnarayan temple, Parule (Vengurle)
 Shri Devi Chamundeshwari temple, Aandurle (Kudal)
 Shri Dev Vetoba temple, Parule (Vengurle)
 Shri Dev Mahapurush temple, Bhogave Wadi Parule (Vengurle)
 Shri Dev Kshetrapal temple, Parule-chipi (Vengurle)
 Shri Dev Maruti temple, Kudal City
 Shri Dev Vetal temple, Pendur (Malvan)
 Shri Dev Lingeshwer temple, Kalse (Malvan)
 Shri Devi Bhavai Bhagavti temple & Dhampur Lake, Dhampur (Malvan)
 Shri Ganesh temple at Sawarwadi
 Shri Lingeshwar-Pavanadevi Mandir, Janavali (Kanakavli)
 Shri Maooli-Ravalnath-Vetal-Bagwe Maharaj Samadhi, Masure
 Shri Bharadi Devi Devasthan, Aangnewadi, Masure, Malvan
 Shri Pavanadevi-Bhagavati-Ravalnath Devasthan, Paliye Wadi, Bandiwade, Masure, Malvan
 Shri Devi Bhadrakali Mandir, Revandi, Malvan
 Shri Dev Kaleshwar Mandir, Kudal
 Shri Kalbhairav temple, Kharepatan (Kankavli)
 Shri Dev Kunkeshwar temple (Devgad)
 Bhagwati Devi temple (Kot Kamte)
 Shri Dev Jaiteer temple, Tulas (Vengurla)
 Shri Dev Vetoba temple, Ajgaon (Sawantwadi)
 Shri Devi Shanta Durga temple, Vadachapat (Malvan)
 Shri Devi Kelbai temple, Kudal
 Shri Devi Mauli temple, Fukeri (Dodamarg)
 Vyagreshwar temple, Manache Devagad
 Shri Devi Bhairavi Mandir Shivapur Kudal near Manohar Manosantosh Gad '
 Ravalnath Mandir, Shivaji Kudal
 Shri Devi Shantadurga temple, Mhapan (Kudal)
 Shri Swayanbhu Rameshwar temple, Ovaliye (Malvan)
 Shri Kshetrapaleshwar temple, Hodawade (Vengurla)
 Shri Dev Chavhateshwar temple, Humaramala-Anao (Kudal)
 Shri Dev Gadekar temple, Tembwadi, Humaramala-Anao (Kudal)
 Shri Sateri Devi temple (Vengurla City)
 Shri Dev Narayan temple Asoli(Vengurla)
 Shri Dev Vetoba temple Aravali (Vengurla)
 Shri Devi Mauli temple Redi (Vengurla)

Beaches

Demographics

According to the 2011 census Sindhudurg district has a population of 849,651, roughly equal to the nation of Qatar or the US state of South Dakota. This gives it a population ranking of 474th in India (out of a total of 640). Its population growth rate over the decade 2001–2011 was -2.21%. Sindhudurg has a sex ratio of 1037 females for every 1000 males, which is second highest in Maharashtra, and a literacy rate of 85.56%. 12.59% of the population lived in urban areas. Scheduled Castes and Scheduled Tribes make up 6.54% and 0.82% of the population respectively.

At the time of the 2011 Census of India, 91.22% of the population spoke Marathi, 2.29% Malwani, 1.65% Konkani, 1.54% Urdu, 1.33% Hindi and 0.93% Kannada as their first language.

Divisions
The eight talukas of this district are Devgad, Kankavli, Malvan, Kudal, Sawantwadi, Vengurla and Dodamarg and Vaibhavwadi.

There are three Vidhan Sabha constituencies in this district. These are Kankavli, Sawantwadi and Kudal. All of these are part of the Ratnagiri-Sindhudurg Lok Sabha constituency.

Localities
Kumbhawade, village
Otvane, settlement

Transportation

Sindhudurg is connected to the state capital Mumbai by road through the erstwhile National Highway 17 (NH-17), now renumbered as NH-66. This highway also connects the district to neighbouring Goa and Karnataka. There are regular MSRTC and private luxury buses connecting to adjoining cities like Kolhapur (110 km away from Kankavli), Belgaum (90 km from Sawantwadi City), Panaji – Goa (55 km away Sawantwadi & Vengurle). Towns and major villages are well connected to Mumbai as a large percentage of emigrants from the district are based in the Mumbai area. The district is also well connected by Konkan Railway to Mumbai, Thane, Goa and other parts of the country like Mangalore, Karwar Ernakulam, Thiruvananthapuram, Coimbatore, Tirunelveli, Hapa, Veraval, New Delhi, Jodhpur and Porbundar. The main railway stations on this route are Kudal, Kankavli and Sawantwadi. Many trains halt at these stations. The nearest major airport is Dabolim Airport in Goa which is around 80 km from cities like Sawantwadi, Kudal and Vengurle. Sindhudurg Airport at Chipi-Parule, near Malvan was inaugurated in 2019.Currently Alliance Air, a subsidiary of Air India provides daily flight services to and from Mumbai.

References

External links

Sindhudurg district official website
Sea Eagle study by Sahyadri Nisarga Mitra 

 
Districts of Maharashtra
1981 establishments in Maharashtra
Konkan division